The Victory Party is a minor kirchnerist political party in Argentina founded in 2003 by Néstor Kirchner and Diana Conti to group independent sectors (those who were not aligned with the Justicialist Party) of the kirchnerist coalition. The party now forms part of the Frente de Todos, the ruling coalition supporting President Alberto Fernández. The party was a founding member of the similarly named Front for Victory, the coalition that led Néstor Kirchner to the presidency in the 2003 election.

History 
The Victory Party was founded in 2003 to bring together all the independent sectors of the Justicialist Party that felt represented by Kirchnerism to support Néstor Kirchner’s bid in that year’s general election.

Since its inception, the party has been part of the Front for Victory alliance, accompanying the candidacy of Néstor Kirchner in 2003, and Cristina Fernández de Kirchner in 2007 and 2011.  In the 2015 elections, the Victory Party, as part of the FPV, supported the candidacy of former Vice President Daniel Scioli, who lost the elections to businessman and politician Mauricio Macri.

Following the 2019 general election, the party counts with representation both in the Argentine Senate (where the president of its Salta chapter, Sergio Leavy, sits in representation of Salta Province) and in the Argentine Chamber of Deputies (with deputies María Cristina Britez and Alcira Figueroa). Another deputy, Juan Emilio Ameri, sat in the lower chamber until 25 September 2020, when he resigned amid a sex scandal.

Electoral performance

President

Chamber of Deputies

See also
Front for Victory
Citizen's Unity

References

Political parties established in 2003
2003 establishments in Argentina
Center-left parties in Argentina
Kirchnerism
Peronist parties and alliances in Argentina